Joseph Richardson is a British artist and co-founder of Ultimate Holding Company an arts collective based in Manchester. Richardson has been involved in a number of collaborative projects including ext-inkt and Polari Mission an artistic exhibition demonstrating Polari's social, cultural and political importance. This exhibition, held at the John Rylands Library in Manchester from August 2013 to February 2014, included the creation of a Polari smart phone app that "provides English to Polari translation".

Other collaborators include artists Jez Dolan and Jai Redman (of Ultimate Holding Company).

References

LGBT linguistics
English artists
Living people
Year of birth missing (living people)